Charles Sedgwick or Charles Sedgewick may refer to:

Charles B. Sedgwick, New York state lawyer and politician
Charles Sumner Sedgwick, Minneapolis architect, whose name has sometimes been presented as "Charles Sedgewick"

See also
Charles H. Sedgwick House, a work by architect Joseph Lyman Silsbee
Charles Sedgwick May
Charles Sedgwick Minot